Penicillium capsulatum is an anamorph fungus species of the genus of Penicillium which was isolated from Panama.

See also
List of Penicillium species

References 

capsulatum
Fungi described in 1948